Cellana nigrolineata  is a species of sea snails or limpets, marine gastropod molluscs in the family Nacellidae, one of the families of true limpets.

This species of limpet lives on rocky shore in the intertidal zone. It occurs mainly along the northwestern coasts of the Pacific Ocean.

Shell description
The typical size varies from 3 to 7 cm. The conical shells are almost flat and almost circular. The shell often has almost regular shell patterning of dark lines, similar in appearance to the mesh of the Polar coordinate system.

References

 Powell A.W.B. (1973). The patellid limpets of the world (Patellidae). Indo-Pacific Mollusca, 3(15):75-206

Nacellidae
Gastropods described in 1854